Ypsilanti, commonly shortened to Ypsi, is a city in Washtenaw County in the U.S. state of Michigan.

As of the 2020 census, the city's population was 20,648. The city is bounded to the north by Superior Township and on the west, south, and east by Ypsilanti Township.

Ypsilanti is the historic site of Michigan State Normal School, now Eastern Michigan University, the fourth normal school established in the United States, and the historical campus of Cleary Business College, now Cleary University. It is also the location of the first Domino's Pizza.

History

Originally a trading post established in 1809 by a French-Canadian fur trader from Montreal, a permanent settlement was established on the east side of the Huron River in 1823 by Major Thomas Woodruff. It was incorporated into the Territory of Michigan as the village Woodruff's Grove. A separate community a short distance away on the west side of the river was established in 1825 under the name "Ypsilanti", after Demetrios Ypsilantis, a hero in the Greek War of Independence. Woodruff's Grove changed its name to Ypsilanti in 1829, the year its namesake effectively won the war for Greek Independence at the Battle of Petra, with the two communities eventually merging. A bust of Demetrios Ypsilantis by Greek sculptor Christopher Nastos stands between a Greek and a US flag at the base of the landmark Ypsilanti Water Tower.

Ypsilanti has played an important role in the automobile industry. From 1920 to 1922, Apex Motors produced the "ACE" car. It was in Ypsilanti that Preston Tucker (whose family owned the Ypsilanti Machine Tool Company) designed and built the prototypes for his Tucker '48. Tucker's story was related in the film Tucker: The Man and His Dream, directed by Francis Ford Coppola.

In 1945, Henry J. Kaiser and Joseph W. Frazer bought the nearby Willow Run B-24 Liberator bomber plant from Ford Motor Company, and started to make Kaiser and Frazer model cars in 1947. The last Kaiser car made in Ypsilanti rolled off the assembly line in 1953, when the company merged with Willys-Overland and moved production to Toledo, Ohio. General Motors purchased the Kaiser Frazer plant, and converted it into its Hydramatic Division (now called its Powertrain division), beginning production in November 1953. The GM Powertrain Division ceased production at this facility in 2010.

Ypsilanti is also the location of the last Hudson automobile dealership. Today, the former dealership is the site of the Ypsilanti Automotive Heritage Collection. The museum is the home to an original Fabulous Hudson Hornet race car, which inspired the character Doc Hudson in the 2006 Pixar animated film Cars.

In the early 1970s, the citizens reduced the penalty for the use and sale of marijuana to $5 (the Ypsilanti Marijuana Initiative; see also the Human Rights Party).

In 1979, Faz Husain was elected to the Ypsilanti city council, the first Muslim and the first native of India to win elected office in Michigan.

In the 1990s Ypsilanti became the first city in Michigan to pass a living wage ordinance.

On July 23, 2007, Governor Jennifer Granholm announced that Ypsilanti, along with the cities of Caro and Clio, was chosen by the Michigan State Housing Development Authority (MSHDA) to take part in the Blueprints for Michigan's Downtowns program.  The award provides for an economic development consultant to assist Ypsilanti in developing a growth and job creation strategy for the downtown area.

On June 23, 2020, Mayor Beth Bashert resigned after controversial comments she made about race during a Zoom meeting.

Timeline
 1809 – Trading post established by French-Canadian Gabriel Godfroy from Montreal
 1823 – Village of Woodruff's Grove platted
 1825 – April 21, Plat recorded under the name Ypsilanti
 1827 – Ypsilanti Township organized
 1832 – June 19, Woodruff's Grove re-organized and incorporated as the Village of Ypsilanti
 1849 – Eastern Michigan University founded as Michigan State Normal School
 1858 – February 4, the Village of Ypsilanti reincorporated as a city
 1890 – Michigan's first interurban, the Ann Arbor and Ypsilanti Street Railway, begins service
 1890 – The Ypsilanti Water Tower is completed
 1929 – Miller Motors Hudson opens, it eventually becomes the last Hudson dealership in the world
 1931 – McKenny Union opens as the first student union on the campus of a teachers' college.
 1959 – Eastern Michigan becomes a university
 1960 – Tom Monaghan and James Monaghan found Domino's Pizza as DomiNick's Pizza at 507 W. Cross St, Ypsilanti.
 1967 – Ypsilanti resident John Norman Collins is suspected of being the perpetrator of the Michigan murders, a series of murders of coeds at the University of Michigan and Eastern Michigan University.  He was convicted in 1969, but of only one of the murders.
 1990 – Eastern Michigan University achieves its highest student enrollment of 26,000
 1998 – The Michigan Firehouse Museum is established preserving a firehouse built in 1898.

Geography

The Huron River flows through Ypsilanti with Ford Lake on the southern edge of the city.  Paint Creek also runs through the city.  The Border-to-Border Trail runs through the city.

Demographics

2010 census
As of the census of 2010, there were 19,435 people, 8,026 households, and 2,880 families residing in the city. The racial makeup of the city was 61.5% White, 29.2% African American, 0.6% Native American, 3.4% Asian, 1.1% from other races, and 4.3% from two or more races. Hispanic or Latino of any race were 3.9% of the population.

There were 8,026 households, of which 18.4% had children under the age of 18 living with them, 19.7% were married couples living together, 12.1% had a female householder with no husband present, 4.0% had a male householder with no wife present, and 64.1% were non-families. 42.9% of all households were made up of individuals, and 7.8% had someone living alone who was 65 years of age or older. The average household size was 2.06 and the average family size was 2.92.

The median age in the city was 25 years. 14.1% of residents were under the age of 18; 35.8% were between the ages of 18 and 24; 25.3% were from 25 to 44; 16.6% were from 45 to 64; and 8.3% were 65 years of age or older. The gender makeup of the city was 49.7% male and 50.3% female.

2000 census
As of the census of 2000, there were 22,362 people, 8,551 households, and 3,377 families residing in the city. The racial makeup of the city was 61.40% White, 30.58% African American, 0.44% Native American, 3.18% Asian, 0.07% Pacific Islander, 1.32% from other races, and 3.01% from two or more races. Hispanic or Latino of any race were 2.47% of the population. 13.6% were of German, 6.8% Irish, 6.4% English and 5.5% Polish ancestry according to Census 2000.

There were 8,551 households, out of which 19.2% had children under the age of 18 living with them, 23.0% were married couples living together, 13.2% had a female householder with no husband present, and 60.5% were non-families. 40.4% of all households were made up of individuals, and 6.2% had someone living alone who was 65 years of age or older. The average household size was 2.15 and the average family size was 2.96.

In the city the population was spread out, with 15.9% under the age of 18, 38.2% from 18 to 24, 26.4% from 25 to 44, 12.4% from 45 to 64, and 7.0% who were 65 years of age or older. The median age was 24 years. For every 100 females, there were 89.8 males. For every 100 females age 18 and over, there were 86.2 males.

The median income for a household in the city was $28,610, and the median income for a family was $40,793. Males had a median income of $30,328 versus $26,745 for females. The per capita income for the city was $16,692. About 16.9% of families and 25.8% of the population were below the poverty line, including 30.1% of those under age 18 and 15.3% of those age 65 or over.

Arts and culture
Domino's Pizza was founded in Ypsilanti in 1960 near the campus of Eastern Michigan University.

By 1963, Clara Owens established the Ypsilanti Greek Theater in Ypsilanti, Michigan for the performance of Greek theater productions.

In 1966 the Ypsilanti Greek Theater opened at the EMU Baseball field. Bert Lahr and Dame Judith Anderson starred in two productions, The Oresteia, a trilogy of Greek tragedies written by Aeschylus and The Birds by playwright Aristophanes.

Since 1979, the city has become known for summer festivals in the part of the city called "Depot Town", which is adjacent to both Riverside and Frog Island Parks along the banks of the Huron River. Festivals include the annual Ypsilanti Heritage Festival, Michigan ElvisFest, the Orphan Car Festival, the Michigan Brewers Guild Summer Beer Festival, the former Frog Island Festival, and a Latino festival.

Painter Fay Kleinman moved to Ypsilanti in the late 1980s with her husband, pianist Emanuel Levenson.

Overlooking Riverside Park is the non-profit Riverside Arts Center. Established in 1994 through the efforts of the Ypsilanti Downtown Development Authority and several public spirited citizens, the Riverside boasts a 115-seat black box theater, a sizable art gallery and some meeting rooms and offices. In 2006 the adjacent DTE building was renovated with "Cool Cities Initiative" money and is in the process of being incorporated into the center's activities.

Since 2013, Ypsilanti has participated in First Fridays, an arts and culture-based monthly event that features a self-guided tour of participating businesses highlighting local artists, and often free samples of food and drink. The same organization that coordinates the Ypsilanti First Friday event series coordinates Ypsi Pride, established in 2017, and the Festival of the Honey Bee. Ypsi Pride takes place on the first Friday in June and seeks to celebrate LGBTQ+ culture across the community by hosting a variety of family friendly programming, entertainment, and educational content.

Sites of interest

Ypsilanti has the second largest contiguous historic district in the state of Michigan, behind only the much larger city of Grand Rapids. The Ypsilanti Historic District includes both downtown Ypsilanti, along Michigan Avenue, and the Depot Town area adjacent to Frog Island Park and Riverside Park, which features many specialty shops, bars and grills, and a farmers' market.

The Tridge connects Riverside Park, Frog Island Park, and Depot Town.

The Ypsilanti Water Tower, adjacent to the campus of Eastern Michigan University, holds the unique distinction of being the winner of the Most Phallic Building contest.

Other sites of interest include:
 Ypsilanti District Library
 Ypsilanti Historical Museum (housed in a Victorian mansion built in 1860)
 Automotive Heritage Museum
 Michigan Firehouse Museum
 Ypsilanti Water Tower, built in 1890
 Ypsilanti Food Co-op
 Highland Cemetery, founded in 1864
 Pease Auditorium, built in 1914 (on the campus of Eastern Michigan University)
 Starkweather House, built circa 1840
 Starkweather Hall, built in 1896 as a student religious center
 Peninsular Paper Dam
 Ladies' Literary Club Building, built in approximately 1843
 Brinkerhoff–Becker House, built in 1863–69

Parks and recreation
There are many parks within the city limits of Ypsilanti, including:

 Border to Border Trail
 Prospect Park
 Riverside Park, which hosts the Ypsilanti Heritage Festival, Michigan ElvisFest, and Michigan Summer Beer Festival
 Frog Island Park
 Rutherford Municipal Pool, which re-opened in 2014 after community members raised $1 million for reconstruction

Education

K–12 education
Ypsilanti Community Schools serve residents of the city, as well as parts of Ypsilanti Township and Superior Township. Ypsilanti Public Schools and Willow Run Community Schools merged to form a new, united district on July 1, 2013. Charter schools in the city include Arbor Preparatory High School.

It also was the setting of a well known and long running High/Scope Perry Preschool Study regarding the effects of early childhood education in children. The study researched the effects of preschool on the later lives of low income children from the area.

Global Educational Excellence operates the Global Tech Academy (PreK-5) in nearby Ypsilanti Township.

Higher education
A college town, Ypsilanti is home to Eastern Michigan University, founded in 1849 as Michigan State Normal School. Today, Eastern Michigan University has 17,500+ undergraduate and more than 4,800 graduate students. As well, Ypsilanti is home to Washtenaw Community College (WCC) sponsored off-site extension center.

Media
Ypsilanti is served by daily newspapers from Detroit. Ypsilanti once had its own daily newspaper, the Ypsilanti Press, but that paper closed June 28, 1994, after 90 years in business. Upon closing, the Press sold its masthead, archives and subscriber list to The Ann Arbor News, which then began publishing an Ypsilanti edition. The Ann Arbor News ceased publication on July 23, 2009; it was replaced by a new Internet-based news operation, AnnArbor.com, which also produces print editions on Thursdays and Sundays. A weekly newspaper, the Ypsilanti Courier, is published every Thursday by Heritage Media from their Saline, Michigan offices. The only newspaper currently operating in Ypsilanti is Eastern Michigan University's independent newspaper The Eastern Echo.

Local radio stations include:
 WEMU FM (89.1 FM), a public radio station, which broadcasts jazz and blues music and NPR news from Eastern Michigan University
 WQBR (610 AM carrier-current and University Cable Channel 10), EMU's student-run radio station
 WDEO (990 AM), a Catholic religious radio station targeting the Detroit area
 WSDS (1480 AM), licensed to nearby Salem and a former longtime country-music station, now broadcasts Spanish-language popular music as "La Explosiva" and has studios in Ypsilanti.
 WAAM (1600 AM), a conservative Talk and News station serving Washtenaw County. Broadcasting local talk, sports and music shows. Owned by First Broadcasting.

Infrastructure

Major highways
  forms part of the southern boundary of the city.
  runs concurrently with I-94 through the city.
  is a business loop route through downtown Ypsilanti.
  runs though the city and connects to Ann Arbor.
 The Border-to-Border Trail winds through Ypsilanti, linking the city to Ann Arbor and (eventually) Dexter.

Bus
The Ann Arbor Area Transportation Authority operates bus service in Ypsilanti, with service radiating from the Ypsilanti Transit Center at 220 Pearl Street in downtown.

Notable people

 Blanch Ackers – folk artist and painter
 Ella Anderson - actress known for her role on Henry Danger as Henry's overreactive sister Piper Hart
Nickolas Ashford – songwriter and singer in the duo Ashford & Simpson
 BabyTron - rapper 
Samiya Bashir — American poet and author, born in Ypsilanti
 Mike Bass – NFL player, defensive back for Detroit Lions (1967) and Washington Redskins (1969–1975), scored touchdown in Super Bowl VII
 Walter Briggs Sr. — owner of Detroit Tigers 1919–1952, born in Ypsilanti
 Emor L. Calkins – State president of the Michigan Woman's Christian Temperance Union for 25 years
 Jalen Chatfield – professional ice hockey player
 Byron M. Cutcheon – American Civil War general and U.S. Congressman
 Brandon Denson – professional Canadian Football League player who plays defensive end for the Ottawa Redblacks
 Amy Devers – furniture designer and TV personality (Freeform Furniture, Designer People, Trading Spaces, Fix This Yard, Home Made Simple)
 Adam Gase – former New York Jets head coach
 Rodney Holman – NFL player, tight end for the Cincinnati Bengals (1982–1992), and the Detroit Lions (1993–1995)
 Zeke Jones - American olympic wrestler
 Colby Keller – American visual artist, blogger and former pornographic film actor
 Charles S. Kettles was a retired United States Army lieutenant colonel and a Medal of Honor recipient.
 Carolyn King – one of first girls to play Little League baseball; centerpiece of landmark lawsuit in 1973 that led to Little League dropping boys-only policy
Janae Marie Kroc – record-setting powerlifter and transgender model
 Alfred Lucking – U.S. Congressman
 Helen Walker McAndrew (1825-1906) - Washtenaw County's first female physician and participant in the Underground Railroad
 William McAndrew (1863-1937), educator who served as the superintendent of Chicago Public Schools
 Elijah McCoy – inventor and participant in the Underground Railroad in Ypsilanti
 Shara Nova – lead singer and songwriter for My Brightest Diamond
 K. J. Osborn - NFL player, wide receiver for the Minnesota Vikings
 Russell C. Ostrander – former mayor of Lansing and Chief Justice of the Michigan Supreme Court
 Frank Owen – pitcher for 1906 World Series champion Chicago White Sox
 Lowell Perry – NFL football player, first African American hired to be assistant coach in the NFL
 Iggy Pop – rock star, "Godfather of Punk" - grew up in the Coachville trailer park, lot 963423, on Carpenter Road in Pittsfield Township (near Ypsilanti) during his teenage years at the start of his music career.
 Anthony Sugent - Vocalist for the band SycAmour
 Charles Ramsey – former Eastern Michigan Eagles men's basketball head coach; he played on the YHS baseball, basketball and football teams
 Victor Roache – left fielder for Milwaukee Brewers
 Bob Schneider – prolific songwriter and musician - The Ugly Americans, The Scabs, Joe Rockhead, Texas Bluegrass Massacre, Lonelyland
 Don Schwall – former MLB player (Boston Red Sox, Pittsburgh Pirates, Atlanta Braves)
 Ryan Shay (1979–2007) – long-distance runner
 Michael Joseph Sobran Jr.-known professionally as Joseph Sobran, conservative writer and syndicated columnist
 Bob Sutton – defensive coordinator for NFL's Kansas City Chiefs, New York Jets; head coach for Army 1991–99
 Marie Tharp (1920–2006) – geologist who pioneered understanding of plate tectonics and continental drift
 Preston Tucker (September 21, 1903 – December 26, 1956) was an American automobile entrepreneur, owned the Ypsilanti Tool & Dye Company. 
 Edwin F. Uhl – mayor of Grand Rapids, ambassador, U.S. Secretary of State

In popular culture
 It has been said that Ypsilanti is the Brooklyn to Ann Arbor's Manhattan. Comparable to the gentrification causing many artists, poets, musicians, and hipsters to flee the Lower East Side of Manhattan, New York City to areas like Bushwick, Brooklyn, nearby Ann Arbor has experienced massive increases in land value and taxes over the last several decades. Despite Ann Arbor's reputation in the region as a bohemian cultural center, many creative people have been driven out of the city to Ypsilanti due to these changes. A vibrant, underground arts scene has begun to emerge as a result. This community gathered semiannually at the juried Shadow Art Fair held at the Arbor Brewing Company Microbrewery, which has now evolved into DIYpsi.
 Milton Rokeach's 1964 psychiatric case study, The Three Christs of Ypsilanti, inspired a stage play and two operas. Poet W. H. Auden described it as "a very funny book... about a hospital in which there are three gents, all of whom believe themselves to be the Lord. Which is common enough, except in the case of one—who had actually found a disciple!" 
 The 2017 feature film Three Christs, directed by Jon Avnet, and starring Richard Gere and Peter Dinklage, is based on Milton Rokeach's book and set in Ypsilanti. Though the film was primarily shot in New York, several scenes were shot in downtown Ypsilanti.
 Author Kurt Vonnegut has a chapter titled "A Sappy Girl From Ypsilanti" in his 2005 book A Man Without a Country.
Elizabeth Meriwether's 2006 play Heddatron is largely set in Ypsilanti.
 The Ypsilanti City Council declared Lee Osler's "Back To Ypsilanti" the city's official song in 1983.
 Ypsilanti is the subject of Sufjan Stevens' song, "For The Widows in Paradise, For The Fatherless in Ypsilanti", on his 2003 album Michigan.
 A portrait of jazz guitarist Randy Napoleon, painted by his grandmother, Fay Kleinman, is part of the permanent art collection of the Ypsilanti District Library. Napoleon performed his first public gig as leader at the age of twelve under a tent at the Ypsilanti Heritage Festival, an event sponsored by WEMU radio.
 The Emmanuel Lutheran Church of Ypsilanti hosted filming for two days of the Movie Stone, starring Robert De Niro. The funeral service and a few outside scenes were filmed at the Church, with locals posing as extras.
 In the 2004 cartoon Superior Defender Gundam Force, in the intro for the eighth episode "A Princess, A Cake, and A Winged Knight" a character named Shute goes on to describe his hometown and claims it to be Ypsilanti, Michigan, shortly after he says he was "just kidding" and introduces the city as Neotopia.
 The 2009 film Whip It, directed by Drew Barrymore, was partly filmed in Ypsilanti. 
 Ypsilanti is the setting of Season 3, Episode 8 of the television series, Supernatural, entitled "A Very Supernatural Christmas."

Linguist List
Ypsilanti was also the home to the main editing site of the Linguist List, a major online resource for the field of linguistics. It was mostly staffed by graduate students who attend Eastern Michigan University and runs several database websites and mailing lists.

Nicknames
Ypsilanti is often shortened to "Ypsi," particularly in spoken conversation and local/regional usage.

Because a large number of residents or their ancestors migrated from Appalachia, certain neighborhoods (particularly on the far east side of the city and into Ypsilanti Township) are sometimes called "Ypsitucky." Harriette Arnow's book The Dollmaker, which was made into a film starring Jane Fonda, focused on the lives of these "Ypsituckians."

Recently, the use of the term "Ypsitucky" has come under increased scrutiny due to its historically derogatory connotation.  In 2008, the issue was raised after a dinner being held in Ann Arbor to honor Harriette Arnow was described as an "Ypsitucky Supper" in some of the event organizer's media releases. In 2009, planning began for the "Ypsitucky Jamboree," a new music festival celebrating bluegrass music to be held in Ypsilanti in September 2009; this resulted in objections from some area residents and some members of the City Council, leading to renaming the event as simply "The Jamboree."

Sister cities
 Nafplio, Greece

See also

References

Further reading
 Beakes, Samuel Willard (1906). Past and present of Washtenaw County, Michigan. Chicago: The S.J. Clarke Publishing Co. (1906)
 Bien, Laura (2010). Tales of the Ypsilanti Archives. Charleston, S. C.: The History Press.
 Bien, Laura (2011). Hidden History of Ypsilanti. Charleston, S. C.: The History Press. Archival stories on many topics giving insight into Ypsilanti's history in the 19th and 20th centuries.

External links

 City of Ypsilanti Official Website
 Ypsilanti Area Chamber of Commerce
 

 
Cities in Washtenaw County, Michigan
Appalachian culture in Michigan
Populated places established in 1823
Metro Detroit
Cities in Michigan
Mayors of Ypsilanti, Michigan
1823 establishments in Michigan Territory